Al-Rybat is a sub-district located in Dhi Na'im District, Al Bayda Governorate, Yemen.  Al-Rybat had a population of 5071 according to the 2004 census.

References 

Sub-districts in Dhi Na'im District